Tanami Downs (formerly Mongrel Downs) is an Indigenous Australian-owned cattle station in the Northern Territory of Australia.

Geography

Tanami Downs lies within the Tanami bioregion of hot, dry country, in which the dominant vegetation is spinifex hummock grassland. Though drought-prone and semi-arid, Tanami Downs has some mountainous areas with permanent water, and its northern parts have plains suitable for cattle grazing.

History and administration
Indigenous ownership of Tanami Downs was recognised through the Tanami Downs Land Claim. The claim was lodged in June 1989, and the report under the Aboriginal Land Rights Act 1976 recognising the claim, was delivered in early 1992. Title to the land was officially handed to the traditional owners on 21 December 1992.

The land is owned by the Mungkurrupa Land Trust, which represents the traditional owners, while the station is operated by a board comprising a mix of traditional owners, an outside representative of another pastoral station, and an agricultural consultant.

Notable residents (and traditional owners) of Tanami Downs include Indigenous artists Biddy Rockman Napaljarri and Peggy Rockman Napaljarri.

See also
List of ranches and stations
List of the largest stations in Australia

References

Pastoral leases in the Northern Territory
Stations (Australian agriculture)